Ploéven is a commune in the Finistère department of Brittany in north-western France.

Population
Inhabitants of Ploéven are called in French Ploévenois.

See also
Communes of the Finistère department
Roland Doré sculptor

References

External links

Official website 

Mayors of Finistère Association 

Communes of Finistère